Lekam is a Rural Municipality in Darchula District in the Sudurpashchim Province of far-western Nepal. Lekam has a population of 14838.The land area is 83.98 km2.

References

Rural municipalities in Darchula District
Rural municipalities of Nepal established in 2017